Derek Hulak (born September 2, 1989) is a Canadian professional ice hockey forward who is currently playing for HC Thurgau of the Swiss League (SL).

Playing career
Undrafted out of the University of Saskatchewan, Hulak joined the Texas Stars of the American Hockey League (AHL). He won a Calder Cup with the Stars in 2014.

In 2016, Hulak signed a one-year contract with the Utica Comets after two full seasons with the Stars.

After enduring the 2016–17 season interrupted through injury with the Comets, Hulak left as a free agent to sign with his third AHL club, the Lehigh Valley Phantoms on a one-year deal on July 6, 2017. Hulak was unable to make an appearance with the Phantoms through the entire 2017–18 season, due to continuing injury woes.

On October 5, 2018, the Hershey Bears signed Hulak to a professional tryout (PTO), making the opening night roster for the 2018–19 season. Hulak appeared in eight games through to December, recording two goals and one assist, before he was released from his tryout on December 4. On December 5, the Grand Rapids Griffins signed Hulak to a PTO. He posted 1 goal in 9 games with the Griffins before securing a one-year contract for the remainder of the season with the club on December 28, 2018.

As a free agent from the Griffins Hulak was unable to secure a contract over the summer. Hulak accepted an invitation to attend the Manitoba Moose training camp and was later signed to a professional tryout contract to begin the 2019–20 season on October 4, 2019. Hulak made 18 appearances posting 3 points before the season was ended prematurely due to the COVID-19 pandemic.

On July 27, 2020, Hulak signed his first contract abroad, agreeing to a one-year deal with Swiss second tiered club, HC Thurgau of the Swiss League.

Personal life
His brother is Dan Hulak, a former ice hockey player. He was drafted by the Tampa Bay Lightning in the 1998 NHL Entry Draft.

Career statistics

References

External links

1989 births
Living people
Canadian people of Slovak descent
Canadian ice hockey forwards
Grand Rapids Griffins players
Hershey Bears players
Ice hockey people from Saskatchewan
Manitoba Moose players
Regina Pats players
Sportspeople from Saskatoon
Saskatoon Blades players
Texas Stars players
Tulsa Oilers (1992–present) players
Utica Comets players
Canadian expatriate ice hockey players in the United States